Atelodesmis mannerheimii is a species of beetle in the family Cerambycidae. It was described by Duponchel & Chevrolat in 1841. It is known from Brazil.

References 

Beetles described in 1841
Desmiphorini